The Tahiti national basketball team is the team that represents Tahiti in international basketball and is a member of FIBA Oceania.

References

External links
2007 Tahiti National Basketball Team information

Men's national basketball teams
Basketball